Gordon Kirkland may refer to:

 Gordon Kirkland (humorist) (born 1953), Canadian author, humorist, and writing instructor
 Gordon Kirkland (coach) (1904–1953), sports coach